Manuel "Manu" Dacosse is a Belgian cinematographer. He is known for his work with directors Hélène Cattet and Bruno Forzani on the films Amer (2009), The Strange Colour of Your Body's Tears (2013), and Let the Corpses Tan (2017), the last two of which earned him the Magritte Award for Best Cinematography.

He collaborated with director François Ozon on L'Amant double (2017) and By the Grace of God (2019); the latter received five nominations at the 25th Lumières Awards, including Best Cinematography for Dacosse. His film credits also include Torpedo (2012), Mobile Home (2012), Tasher Desh (2012), Alleluia (2014), The Lady in the Car with Glasses and a Gun (2015), Evolution (2015), Axolotl Overkill (2017), Adoration (2019), and The Silencing (2020).

Selected filmography

References

External links

Belgian Society of Cinematographers

Living people
Belgian cinematographers
Magritte Award winners
1977 births